Little Dog Island is a square, flat granite island, with an area of 83 ha, in south-eastern Australia.  It is part of Tasmania’s Great Dog Island Group, lying in eastern Bass Strait between Flinders and Cape Barren Islands in the Furneaux Group.  It is a game reserve.  It was previously grazed, a usage now ceased.  The island is part of the Franklin Sound Islands Important Bird Area, identified as such by BirdLife International because it holds over 1% of the world populations of six bird species.

History
Bass Strait sealer, John Maynard, and Margery, the widow of sealer James Munro, were found here with their families in 1861, probably for the mutton bird harvest.

Fauna
Recorded breeding seabird and wader species are little penguin, short-tailed shearwater (over half a million pairs) and pied oystercatcher.  The sooty oystercatcher, Caspian tern and white-fronted tern have bred on an isolated rock 200 m north of the island.  The swamp harrier has bred on the island.  Reptiles present include the metallic skink and tiger snake.  The growling grass frog has been recorded.

See also

 List of islands of Tasmania

References

Furneaux Group
Important Bird Areas of Tasmania